Takeaki (written: ,  or ) is a masculine Japanese given name. Notable people with the name include:

, Japanese samurai and Imperial Japanese Navy admiral
, Japanese politician
, Japanese manga artist

Japanese masculine given names